The 1993 Missouri Valley Conference men's soccer season was the 3rd season of men's varsity soccer in the conference.

The 1993 Missouri Valley Conference Men's Soccer Tournament was hosted and won by Creighton.

Teams

MVC Tournament

See also 

 Missouri Valley Conference
 Missouri Valley Conference men's soccer tournament
 1993 NCAA Division I men's soccer season
 1993 in American soccer

References 

Missouri Valley Conference
1993 NCAA Division I men's soccer season